Baling wire, otherwise known as bale wire, farm wire, haywire or soft wire, is a type of wire used in agriculture and industry for many uses such as mending fences or manually binding rectangular bales of hay, straw, or cut grass. It is also used in many non-agricultural applications such as banding together corrugated cardboard, paper, textiles, aluminum and other materials that are processed in the recycling industry.

Baling wire is sometimes used in an informal, make-do manner as an easy fix. It is frequently referred to as one of the basic repair materials. Typical uses include supporting loose mufflers and patching chain-link fences. Common phrases often include baling wire as an ad hoc, fix-anything material, alongside chewing gum, duct tape, and the cable tie.

Uses
In the United States, Australia, and around the world, baling wire was used in mechanical hay balers pulled behind a tractor. The automated balers used a wire twister that first cut then twisted the ends of the wire such that the bale kept its shape after the baler had pressed the hay into a tight rectangular bale. These hay balers were in common use up until the late 1980s. When the hay was fed to livestock the wire was cut and often hung in bundles or stored in barrels or metal drums around the farm. Farmers used the soft wire for temporary repairs of a wide variety of objects on the farm, such as fences, leather horse harnesses, head stalls and bridles, or as pins to keep castellated nuts in place on the tractor. Even small screwdrivers could be made by cutting a short length of wire and looping one end for grip. The other end was then flattened and shaped to make a screwdriver.

Baling wire was a commonly used product for many years before it was replaced by baling twine in the late 1970s. Small rolls of soft iron wire are still readily available and used for tying rebar together and for general utility use. A similar product is Mechanic's wire or Utility wire.

Etymology
'Baling wire' is sometimes misspelled as 'bailing wire', but 'bailing' usually refers to throwing water out of a boat, while 'baling' means gathering material into bales.

It is also known as 'haywire', from which several slang terms arose. The term 'haywire outfit' referred to a poorly equipped or slipshod job or factory, implying that the tools and equipment used have been repaired with haywire. The term 'to go haywire', meaning to go wrong or behave unpredictably, arose either from the wire's tendency to become entangled if improperly handled, or from the wire's use to fix anything in an ad hoc manner.

See also
Number 8 wire

References

Wire